Fruktsoda (Swedish for: fruit soda) is a lemon-lime flavored soft drink from Sweden, similar to 7 Up and Sprite. Fruktsoda is made by various breweries in Sweden. It is also a popular ingredient in cocktails.

Lemon-lime sodas
Soft drinks
Swedish drinks